Richard Pockrich (c. 1666 – 1719) was an Irish landowner, military commander and Member of Parliament.

Career
He raised and commanded an independent company during the Williamite wars and was wounded at the siege of Athlone in 1690. He represented Monaghan Borough in the Irish House of Commons from 1713 to 1714. The family estate was at Derrylusk, Co. Monaghan, where they had extensive property. When he died his estate was estimated at £1000 to £4,000 per year.

Family
He married the granddaughter of the Cavan Borough MP Brockhill Taylor and was the father of Richard Pockrich, the inventor of the Angelic organ. Another son, Newburgh, married the daughter of Cavan Borough MP Brockhill Newburgh.

References
www.glassarmonica.com

1670s births
1719 deaths
Irish MPs 1713–1714
Members of the Parliament of Ireland (pre-1801) for County Monaghan constituencies